The Mosque Qor-peoh, also known as the Qor-peoh Mosque, is a mosque located near the city of Almtihh in Basra, Iraq. It has been in reconstruction since 2013.

See also

 Islam in Iraq
 List of mosques in Iraq
Siddiqa Fatima Zahra Mosque, Kuwait

Buildings and structures in Basra
Mosques in Iraq